Igor Vasilev, credited as Novogradska (Macedonian Cyrillic: Игор Василев; born June 22, 1978, in Skopje, SR Macedonia, SFRY) is a Macedonian composer/musician.  He is most famous for his work with Milčo Mančevski on the soundtracks to the films Mothers and Bikini Moon.  He collaborated with Macedonian singer Karolina Gočeva on the hit song Ajde da letame, which topped the national charts in 2000 and 2001.  He also did music for the two commercials under the title "Macedonia Timeless," which were aired on CNN and many other television stations worldwide promoting Macedonian tourism.

Filmography 
 Against the tide Composer. — dir. Sarvnik Kaur
 Kaymak Additional music  - dir. Milcho Manchevski
 Siterhood (Netflix 2021) Composer. — dir. Dina Duma
 Zoki Poki (Tv Series 2020) Title music - dir. Marija Apcevska
 Snake (Short 2019) composer - dir. Andrej Volkasin
 Willow Additional music - dir. Milcho Manchevski
 The Witness (film 2018) Arranger / Additional music - dir. Mitko Panov
 Mi(s)sing dog. (Short 2018)  Composer. - dir. Antonio Veljanovski
 Slovenia, Australia and Tomorrow the World Composer (film 2017) - dir. Marko Nabersnik
 Bikini Moon Composer. - dir. Milcho Manchevski
 Kolivo (short 2017) Composer. - dir. Andrej Volkasin
 The End Of Time Composer. - dir. Milcho Manchevski
 Thursday Composer - dir. Milcho Manchevski
 Mothers'' Composer - dir. Milcho Manchevski

See also
Music of the Republic of Macedonia

References 
 'Variety' Magazine review for Mothers
 'Cineuropa' European Cinema Portal
 'IMDB' Igor Vasilev Novogradska

External links 
 Official Website
 
 Macedonia Timeless Website

1978 births
Living people
Macedonian film score composers
Musicians from Skopje